Potto is a village and civil parish in the Hambleton district of North Yorkshire, England. Potto has a pub, a church and a haulage company.

History
The settlement of Potto can be traced to the 13th century, when it was owned by the Meynell family, as part of the manor of Whorlton. Part of the estate passed to Dame Elizabeth Strangways in the 16th century and then to the Earl of Rutland. Another part, held by the original de Potto family and awarded to different land owners by royal grant, was merged into the Whorlton estate of the Marquess of Ailesbury.

In the 19th century, the village was connected by a rail freight line from Swainby to serve the ironstone and jet mines in the area. Potto had a passenger station on the Picton–Battersby line, but its remoteness from the village and the introduction of buses that could take roads direct to Middlesbrough led to its closure in 1954. The former station was bought by Richard Preston Snr, whose son used it for his haulage company; Prestons of Potto. It is now a private dwelling.

In the mid-to-late 1950s the village became known as the village with "the pub that never opened". If a person wanted to enter, the owner looked through the window to see if you were respectable. After his death, the pub and contents were sold.

Geography
Located close to the western border of North York Moors National Park, the surrounding villages are Swainby to the south, Hutton Rudby and Rudby to the north, Faceby and Carlton in Cleveland to the east.

See also
Civil parishes in Hambleton
Civil parishes in North Yorkshire

References

Villages in North Yorkshire
Civil parishes in North Yorkshire